Alishan Qeshlaqi (also Romanized as ‘Alīshān Qeshlāqī; also known as ‘Alīshān Qeshlāq) is a village in Anjirlu Rural District, in the Central District of Bileh Savar County, Ardabil Province, Iran. At the 2006 census, its population was 133, in 23 families.

References 

Towns and villages in Bileh Savar County